William Adam may refer to:

William Adam (died c.1341), French archbishop and missionary
William Adam (architect) (1689–1748), Scottish architect, mason, and entrepreneur
William Adam of Blair Adam (1751–1839), Scottish Member of the British Parliament and judge
William Patrick Adam (1823–1881), British colonial administrator and Liberal politician
William Adam (minister) (1796–1881), Baptist minister, missionary, abolitionist
William Adam (artist) (1846–1931), English landscape artist who worked in California for 33 years
William Adam (malacologist) (1909–1988), Belgian malacologist
William Adam (trumpeter) (1917–2013), American trumpeter, and professor emeritus at Indiana University
William Augustus Adam (1865–1940), British and army officer and Conservative Party politician
Will Adam, Archdeacon of Canterbury

See also
Bill Adam (born 1946), racing driver 

William Adams (disambiguation)